is a former Argentine football player. His brother Osvaldo Escudero and son Sergio Escudero are also footballers.

Playing career
Escudero has played for Vélez Sarsfield, Chacarita Juniors, Granada, and Atlanta. Sergio also played for a short time with Urawa Reds in Japan in 1992, where he played with his brother Osvaldo Escudero. However he could not play in the match in top team, he retired end of 1992 season.

Personal life
His son, also named Sergio Escudero, is also a footballer, following his father footsteps playing for Urawa Reds, and currently plays for Tochigi SC. Escudero junior is also a former Japan U-23 national team player. In June 2007, Escudero acquired Japanese citizenship with his son.

His nephew Damián Escudero, son of Osvaldo, is also a footballer.

Club statistics

References

External links
 
 Profile at BDFA.com.ar 

1964 births
Living people
Argentine footballers
Japanese footballers
Argentine expatriate footballers
Expatriate footballers in Japan
J1 League players
Urawa Red Diamonds players
Naturalized citizens of Japan
Association football midfielders
Footballers from Buenos Aires